Barry Johnston (born 28 October 1980) is a former Irish footballer .

After serving apprenticeships at Celtic Boys under Jim Heaney, in 2009 Johnston joined Cliftonville's U18. Although he believed he would have preferred becoming a winger, the coach Heaney considered his best position was a defensive sweeper or right back.

Johnston suffered a leg injury, which almost terminated his career and which left him with nine screws and a steel plate anchored to his marrow. In 2000, Johnston took a leave from football and spent a two-year scholarship in the United States in New Orleans with William Carey College.

After returning from the United States, he came back playing football at Coleraine. He stayed there for four years, reaching two IFA Cup Finals in 2003 and 2004 against Glentoran, winning the first one.

Johnston moved back to Cliftonville in January 2006. He lost another IFA Cup Final in May 2009 against Crusaders.

In 2009, he signed a loan for Shamrock Rovers after impressing in guest appearances against Newcastle and Hibernians, making his competitive debut as a substitute in a win over Derry City at Tallaght Stadium.

Johnston returned in Northern Ireland to sign for Glenavon in December 2009.

He then signed for Cliftonville for the third time in September 2010.

Johnston scored Cliftonville's equaliser against The New Saints in the 2011–12 UEFA Europa League.

In July 2015, Johnston moved to newly promoted Carrick Rangers. Johnston moved due to a knee injury which prevented him from playing as much on artificial turf.

Johnston retired in 2016 and joined the Cliftonville staff in March 2018.

Honours
  IFA Cup
 Coleraine - 2003
  County Antrim Shield
 Cliftonville - 2006/07, 2008/09

References

1980 births
Living people
Association football midfielders
Cliftonville F.C. players
Coleraine F.C. players
NIFL Premiership players
Shamrock Rovers F.C. guest players
Shamrock Rovers F.C. players
League of Ireland players
Glenavon F.C. players
Republic of Ireland association footballers